Phillida Gili is a British children's book illustrator. One of her best-known works is a 1992 pop-up version of The Nutcracker.

Biography
Phillida Gili is the daughter of Reynolds Stone and Janet Woods. He was a wood engraver, engraver, designer, typographer and painter; she was a singer and photographer. Gili won a prize from The Young Elizabethan magazine as a child for drawing a human foot from the perspective of an ant. She studied at the St Martin's School of Art, telling UK daily newspaper The Guardian in March 2015 that Fritz Wegner, a visiting lecturer at St Martin's, "gave me the first words of encouragement I ever received at art school".

She was married to filmmaker Jonathan Gili, with whom she had three children. She lives in London.

Work
Gili's work includes illustrating and sometimes writing children's books. Some of her works are Sir John Betjeman's Archie and the Strict Baptists, The Nutcracker, Sleeping Beauty, picture books by Nina Bawden and Jenny Nimmo, a pop-up version of Cinderella, and The Lost Ears. She has also illustrated "for calendars, cards and stationery by Laura Ashley, [for] the National Trust, and for advertising".

References

External links

 

British children's book illustrators
Year of birth missing (living people)
Place of birth missing (living people)
Living people
20th-century British women artists
Alumni of Saint Martin's School of Art